Berende is a village in Dragoman Municipality, Sofia Province, in the westernmost part of Bulgaria near the border with Serbia.

Berende is located in the western reaches of the Balkan Mountains, not far from the banks of the Nishava River. In 1985, Berende had 79 residents; in 2011, its population had dwindled to 33.

According to linguist Anna Choleva–Dimitrova, the toponym Berende stems from the Pecheneg tribe of the Berendei. The Berendei are known to have settled in various parts of the Balkans around the 10th–12th century.

The village has a medieval Bulgarian Orthodox church, the Church of St Peter, which features rich 14th-century interior frescoes. Today, the churches lies in the village's old graveyard. Not far from the church on the way linking it to the village is Mosta (Моста, “The Bridge”), a natural bridge rock formation.

References

Villages in Sofia Province